Chris Kaji (born 31 January 2000) is a Canadian artistic gymnast.

In 2018, he won the bronze medal in the men's rings event at the Pacific Rim Gymnastics Championships held in Medellín, Colombia.

References

External links 
 

Living people
2000 births
Place of birth missing (living people)
Canadian male artistic gymnasts
Gymnasts at the 2022 Commonwealth Games
Commonwealth Games silver medallists for Canada
Commonwealth Games bronze medallists for Canada
Commonwealth Games medallists in gymnastics
21st-century Canadian people
Medallists at the 2022 Commonwealth Games